Zalan FC is a South Sudanese team from Rumbek. They compete in the South Sudan Premier League, finishing second in Group B in 2017.
Zarlan lost to Young Africans of Tanzania in CAF Champions League(4-0) on 10th Sept 2022

History

In 2017 Zalan FC lost the UNMISS Peace Cup 4–2 to Gonzaga FC. In 2018 Zalan FC won the South Sudan Premier League cup after beating Gold Star team 4–0.

Current squad

See more
 South Sudan

 South Sudan national football team

References

Football clubs in South Sudan